Thomas Reinhold (born in 1953, Vienna, Austria) is an Austrian painter, one of the initiators of so-called “New Painting” (in German Junge Wilde).

Life 
From 1974 to 1978, Reinhold studied at the University of Applied Arts Vienna under Herbert Tasquil. During his university studies, Reinhold concentrated on poetic-magical paintings and photographs, dealing with the objecthood of the image. In the late 1970s, Reinhold was one of the initiators of so-called “New Painting” (in German Junge Wilde) together with Siegfried Anzinger, Erwin Bohatsch, Alfred Klinkan and Hubert Schmalix. In the mid-1980s, Reinhold has begun to focus on issues of medium reflexivity of painting and photography, which has been dominating his work until today. Reinhold lives in Vienna.

Work 
Painting

Reinhold’s large-scale oil paintings address such issues as medium reflexivity, the material dimension of paint, or the canvas plane and its relation to space. The paintings deal with questions of their own creation and their relation to time by showing overlapping layers of colour. Because of this, the beholder needs to see the paintings in an almost archaeological way to explore the pictorial space.
In 2011, Reinhold worked on the series “Tectonics of Poise“. The subject of this group of works reflects on their own creation. Liquid paint coalesces around a dead centre, permitting – for a few moments – a process of ordered decision making. The painting procedure, in which the allocation of the centre of gravity is such an essential element, actually provokes this fleeting state where indeterminacy gives way to form. It is this point of transition that attracts attention and produces shapes seemingly suspended between rivulets.

Photography
Since the beginning of his career, Reinhold has been interested in photography. In his 1977 “Ferris wheel series” he addresses issues of space, time and chronology. The series’ central motif, the “Wiener Riesenrad” (Viennese Ferris wheel) stands for questions of mobility and immobility, object and its image. In 2010, Reinhold lived in Shanghai for three months, where worked on the series “Brushstrokes of Light, Living Shades”. The photographs for this series were taken by night, and the resulting images recall the superimposition techniques employed in Reinhold‘s paintings. The paintings in the series are ink paintings made with a Chinese calligraphy brush, which remind the beholder of the early days of photography. Both the motifs and the technique are linked to the city Shanghai.

Public Work
In 1999, Reinhold got the assignment of designing the windows of the Chapel of the Resurrection, Rue van Maerlant in Brussels, which he completed in 2002 in cooperation with the glass painting manufactory Schlierbach, Austria. As a result of the fusion technique used in the windows' production, their transparency provides a 'display model' of visual depth, the superimposition of different layers, and the relationship between coexistence and sequence. This allows the viewer to reflect on his or her own position. Looking out, the transitional coloured layer merges with the facades of the European government buildings opposite, while trees, an expanse of lawn, passing cars and people contribute their shapes and colours to a background layer of reality and add to the view as a whole.

Recognition 
2011: Award for Fine Arts, City of Vienna

Exhibitions 
Selected individual exhibitions
  2012: "Tectonics of Poise", kunsthaus muerz, Mürzzuschlag, Austria; Gallery Kunst und Handel, Graz, Austria
  2011: Gallery Gölles Fürstenfeld, Austria
  2009: „Wesentlich“, Gallery Michitsch Vienna, Austria
  2008: „repro-spektiv:re-produktiv, aus dem vollen geschöpft“, Gallery Kunst & Handel, Graz, Austria
  2006: „From the Nature to an Architecture of Painting“, HF Contemporary Art, London, United Kingdom
  2005: „synergie:paradox“, cooperation with Julie Hayward, Museum of Modern Art, Admont Abbey, Austria
  1997: "Malweise“, Vienna Secession Vienna, Austria
  1995: "Polyptychon“, Kunsthaus Galerie, Mürzzuschlag, Austria
  1988: Valente, arte contemporanea, Finale Ligure, Italy
  1987: Gallery Springer Berlin, Germany - „Stand und Gegenstand“, Skulpturen, Vienna Secession Vienna, Austria
  1984: Gallery Heike Curtze, Vienna, Austria and Düsseldorf, Germany
  1983: Gallery Ariadne, Vienna, Austria
  1980: Forum Stadtpark, Graz, Austria

Selected group exhibitions
  2012: The Sigrid and Franz Wojda Collection, MMKK, Museum of Modern Art Carinthia, Austria
  2011: "Realität und Abstraktion", Museum Liaunig Neuhaus, Austria
  2010: “Painting: Process and Expansion”, MUMOK Foundation Ludwig Vienna, Austria, curators: Rainer Fuchs, Edelbert Köb
  2007: “Konzeptuelle Fotografie aus Sammlungsbesitz”, Museum of Modern Art Rupertinum, Salzburg, Austria, curator: Margit Zuckriegl
  2006: „Crossover“, Koroska Galerija Slovenj Gradec, Slowenia, curator: Silvie Aigner
  2004: „Vision einer Sammlung“, Museum of Modern Art Rupertinum, Salzburg, Austria, curator: Agnes Husslein Arco
  1998: „KUNST mit durch über SCHRIFT", Internationale Kunst der letzten fünfzig Jahre aus der Sammlung Kübler, Atterseehalle, Attersee, Austria, curator: Margit Zuckriegl - „Contemporary Austrian Painters“, The Rotunda, One Exchange Square, Hong Kong, China, curator: Christiane Inmann
  1997: „Positionen österreichischer Malerei heute“, Centre Cultural Sala Parpallo Valencia, Spain, curator: Lóránd Hegyi
  1994: „Wilde und neuwilde österreichische Bildkunst aus dem Besitz der Salzburger Landessammlung Rupertinum", Salzburg, Austria, curator: Otto Breicha
  1993: „Konfrontationen“, Neuerwerbungen, MUMOK Foundation Ludwig Vienna, Austria
  1992: „Surface radicale“, Grand Palais Paris, France, Los Angeles Convention Center, USA, University of Applied Arts Vienna, Austria, curator: Lóránd Hegyi
  1991: „Kunst, Europa 1991“, Kunstverein in Hamburg, Deichtorhallen, Germany, and Gallery Rähnitzgasse Dresden, Germany, curator: Jürgen Schweinebraden
  1990: „Querdurch“, Dom umenia, Bratislava, Slovakia, curator: Edelbert Köb
  1988: „MALERMACHT, Expression und Pathos in der neuen Österreichischen Malerei“, Künstlerhaus Palais Thurn und Taxis Bregenz, Austria, curator: Christa Häusler
  1985: „Austria ferix", Palazzo Costanzi, Galleria Torbandena Triest, Italy, Gallery Goethe Bolzano, South Tyrol
  1984: „artisti austriaci, due generazioni“, studio cavalieri Bologna, Italy - 6th International Small Sculpture Exhibition, Kunsthalle Budapest, Hungary, curator: Edelbert Köb
  1983: „Neue Malerei in Österreich“, Gallery Jurka Amsterdam, Netherlands - „Joves Salvatges“ Austriacs, Gallery Dau al Set Barcelona, Spain - „Neue Malerei in Österreich ’83“, New Gallery - City of Linz; Austria, curator: Peter Baum
  1981: „Neue Malerei in Österreich“, Neue Gallery Graz, curator: Wilfried Skreiner - 5. Internationale Biennale, Vienna Secession, Austria
  1980: „Das Sofortbild, Entdeckung eines Mediums“, Rheinisches Landesmuseum Bonn, Germany

Works in collections 
  Albertina, Vienna
  Österreichische Galerie Belvedere, Vienna
  Collection FOTOGRAFIS, Vienna, currently on permanent loan in the Museum of Modern Art, Rupertinum, Salzburg, Austria
  Foundation Ludwig Vienna, Austria
  Landesmuseum Niederösterreich, St. Pölten, Austria
  Lentos Kunstmuseum, Linz, Austria
  Museum für Gegenwartskunst Admont Abbey, Styria, Austria
  MMKK Museum of Modern Art Carinthia, Austria
  Museum of Modern Art Salzburg, Austria
  Museum Sztuki, Lodz, Poland
  State Museum of Tyrol, Innsbruck, Austria
Private collections
  Collection Carl Djerassi, Vienna, Austria
  Museum Liaunig, Neuhaus, Austria
  The Sigrid and Franz Wojda Collection, Vienna, Austria

Footnotes

References 
  Carl Aigner/Thomas Reinhold, "Zur Ikonographie von Zeit und Raum", talk in EIKON - Internationale Zeitschrift für Photographie und Medienkunst, Nr. 60/2007
  Matthias Boeckl, "Zeitlose Sinnlichkeit", art magazine Parnass Vienna, Nr. 3/2009
  Brigitte Borchardt-Birbaumer, "Von Wanderschaften als Malerreisen“, Vienna Secession, Wiener Zeitung, April 5, 1997
  Brigitte Borchardt-Birbaumer, "Musil, Hölderlin oder Königin Nefertete“, Gallery Hofstätter Vienna, Wiener Zeitung, March 11, 1999
  Brigitte Borchardt-Birbaumer, "Fahnen, Sonnen und Monde“, Gallery Hofstätter Vienna, Wiener Zeitung, June 11, 2002. Retrieved 2012-01-09.
  Robert Fleck, exhibition catalogue „Malermacht; Expression und Pathos in der neuen Österreichischen Malerei“, Künstlerhaus Palais Thurn und Taxis Bregenz, 1988
  Robert Fleck, exhibition catalogue "Thomas Reinhold, Ölbilder, 1988 - 90“, Gallery Steinek Vienna, 1990
  Lóránd Hegyi, exhibition catalogue "Positionen österreichischer Malerei heute“, Centre Cultural Sala Parpallo Valencia, 1997
  Lóránd Hegyi, "Neue Malerei und Neue Plastik seit den 70er Jahren“, in "Geschichte der bildenden Kunst in Österreich“, 20. Jahrhundert, Wieland Schmied (editor), Munich, 2002
  Barbara Herzog, exhibition catalogue "Vom Tafelbild zum Wandobjekt“, Museum of Modern Art Salzburg, 2005
  Karl A. Irsigler, "Topography: a journey“, Katalog Thomas Reinhold, "Way of Painting“, Vienna Secession, 1997
  Karl A. Irsigler, "Wirklichkeitssinn - Möglichkeitssinn“ - memoirs of Thomas Reinhold in the Gallery Hofstätter Vienna, art magazine Parnass, Vienna, Nr. 1/1999
  Pia Jardí, "La pintura actual en Viena“, Lapiz, Revista Internacional de Arte, Madrid, Nr. 213, 2005
  Pia Jardí, "Licht als Thema und malerisches Element", Thomas Reinholds Intervention an den fünf Fenstern der "Chapel of the Resurrection" in Brüssel - Art magazine Parnass Vienna, Nr. 1/2003
  Edelbert Köb, exhibition catalogue "Painting: Process and Expansion", MUMOK, Foundation Ludwig Vienna,Cologne, 2010
  Margit J. Mayer, "Konsequent - inkonsequent“, in the magazine „Wiener“, Vienna, February 1986
  Otmar Rychlik, "Zu diesen Bildern“, Katalog Thomas Reinhold, "Ölbilder 1986-87“, Gallery Springer Berlin, 1987
  Wilfried Skreiner, "Behauptungen zur Neuen Malerei in Österreich“ in "Sinnpause“, Kunstforum Cologne, Bd 80, 3/1985
  Wilfried Skreiner, "Bildanthologie 1980-87“, Kunstforum Cologne, Bd 89, 6/1987

External links 
 
 Thomas Reinhold auf kunstaspekte.de
 Homepage des Künstlers
 Thomas Reinhold über seine Arbeit auf CastYourArt
 Michael Corbin talks with Thomas Reinhold

Living people
1953 births
20th-century Austrian painters
Austrian male painters
21st-century Austrian painters
21st-century male artists
20th-century Austrian male artists